Kai Yearn (born 21 May 2005) is an English professional footballer currently playing as a midfielder for Cambridge United.

Club career
On 31 August 2021, Yearn made his debut for Cambridge United, becoming youngest player to ever score for the club when he scored the fourth in a 4–1 EFL Trophy victory over Oxford United.

On 12 September 2022, National League South side Chelmsford City announced the signing of Yearn on loan. On 31 December 2022, Yearn was recalled from his loan at Chelmsford. On 13 January 2023, Yearn returned to Chelmsford on loan after featuring twice on the bench for Cambridge. On 2 March 2023, Yearn was once again recalled from his loan by Cambridge.

International career
In March 2021, Yearn was called up to the England under-16 squad. In August 2021, Yearn was selected to represent England U17.

Career statistics

Club
.

Notes

References

2005 births
Living people
Sportspeople from Cambridge
English footballers
Association football midfielders
Cambridge United F.C. players
English Football League players
Chelmsford City F.C. players